The 1998 Boston Cup was a tennis tournament played on outdoor hard courts at the Longwood Cricket Club in Chestnut Hill, Massachusetts in the United States that was part of Tier III of the 1998 WTA Tour. It was the only edition of the tournament and was held from August 10 through August 16, 1998. Unseeded Mariaan de Swardt won the singles title and earned $27,000 first-prize money.

Finals

Singles

 Mariaan de Swardt defeated  Barbara Schett 3–6, 7–6, 7–5
 It was de Swardt's 2nd title of the year and the 4th of her career.

Doubles

 Lisa Raymond /  Rennae Stubbs defeated  Mariaan de Swardt /  Mary Joe Fernández 6–4, 6–4
 It was Raymond's 2nd title of the year and the 11th of her career. It was Stubbs' 2nd title of the year and the 15th of her career.

External links
 ITF tournament edition details
 Tournament draws

Boston Cup
Boston Cup
1998 in American tennis
1998 in Massachusetts
Chestnut Hill, Massachusetts
History of Middlesex County, Massachusetts
Sports in Middlesex County, Massachusetts
Tennis in Massachusetts
Tourist attractions in Middlesex County, Massachusetts